The 1998 LPGA Tour was the 49th season since the LPGA Tour officially began in 1950. The season ran from January 16 to November 22. The season consisted of 36 official money events. Se Ri Pak and Annika Sörenstam won the most tournaments, four each. Annika Sörenstam led the money list with earnings of $1,092,748.

This was the first year that non-American winners outnumbered American winners (19 to 17). There were four first-time winners in 1998: Amy Fruhwirth, Rachel Hetherington, Se Ri Pak, Pearl Sinn.

The tournament results and award winners are listed below.

Tournament results
The following table shows all the official money events for the 1998 season. "Date" is the ending date of the tournament. The numbers in parentheses after the winners' names are the number of wins they had on the tour up to and including that event. Majors are shown in bold.

^ – weather-shortened tournament

Awards

References

External links
LPGA Tour official site
1998 season coverage at golfobserver.com

LPGA Tour seasons
LPGA Tour